Kovasciar Myvette (born August 1, 1985), known by the stage name KOVAS, is an American songwriter, record producer, music composer  and recording artist of Spanish and French descent (Central America and Morocco).

He has produced and remixed records for Justin Timberlake, Chris Brown, Nick Cannon, De La Soul, Nicole Wray, Jeannie Ortega, Shakira, Lady Sovereign, Kelis, M.I.A., Freq Nasty and Billy Crawford. He has done ghost production and songwriting for many successful artists before branching out on his own. KOVAS' songs are represented by Downtown Music Publishing.

In 2017 he won a Clio Award for the Dunkin Donuts campaign he produced, wrote and starred in with New York Giants wide receiver Odell Beckham Jr. Kovas is also the music composer for the Netflix series' On My Block and The Comedy Line Up.

He scored the music for the opening music sequence of Taylor Swift's "I Knew You Were Trouble" MTV VMA Award-winning music video, five Covergirl commercials. One directed by Hype Williams starring Queen Latifah and another starring Drew Barrymore which air in America and French Canada. His single "Ready" has been featured in the Vibe Magazine Music Mixer iPad app, and has been featured in USA Networks TV show Royal Pains and Necessary Roughness as well as in MTV Rob Dyrdek's Fantasy Factory. Kovas has also had his T.O.A.K featured on the season of Fox's American Dad! from creator Seth MacFarlane who is also the creator of Family Guy. His song "Up in Here" is featured on the Chocolate Swim, Cartoon Network's Adult Swim compilation as well as the Oscar nominated film Captain Phillips. Hot Girls appeared in the #1 film 22 Jump Street.

He is featured on Jeannie Ortega's No Place Like BKLYN album, on which, he wrote and produced three songs; "Pay It" featuring Kovas, "Green I'z" and "Hear Me". He is also featured on the French recording artist's Billy Crawford album, Big City. He produced and wrote four songs on it, including the single "Steamy Nights" and "Steamy Nights Ghetto Beat Remix".

KOVAS has a production company & indie record label called Ghetto Beat & Art School Rebellion. He also runs a publishing company Infinite Rhythm Inc.

KOVAS has appeared on tour with De La Soul, Billy Crawford, Phife Dawg of A Tribe Called Quest, Wyclef Talib Kweli Mos Def and Jeannie Ortega. Kovas plays five instruments, sings, raps and engineers on most of his productions. He has done musical scores for film and TV, winning an Art Directors Award for the ad campaign he wrote and scored for Noggin television.

KOVAS produced, composed and appeared in Dunkin Donuts with New York Giants wide receiver  Odell Beckham Jr.

Discography

Production credits
 2001: "Words & Verbs" (Maseo De La Soul) feat.(KOVAS) (single)
 2002: "Brooklyn to Brixton" (Freq Nasty) feat.(KOVAS) (single)
 2003: "Attitude" (Nick Cannon)
 2004: "Intro" (Billy Crawford)(Big City)
 2004: "Steamy Nights" (Billy Crawford)(Big City)
 2004: "Three Wishes" (Billy Crawford) feat.(KOVAS) (Big City)
 2004: "Hiccups" (Billy Crawford)(Big City)
 2004: "Cowboy" (Billy Crawford) feat. (KOVAS) (Big City)
 2005: "Bounce" (Rosette) feat.(KOVAS) (Uh Oh)
 2005: "Mirage" (Rosette) feat.(KOVAS) (Uh Oh)
 2005: "Delirious Ghetto Beat Remix" (Rosette) feat.(KOVAS) (Uh Oh)
 2005: "I Owe" (Rosette) (Uh Oh)
 2006: "Pay It" (Jeannie Ortega) feat.(KOVAS) (No Place Like Brooklyn)
 2006: "Green I'z" (Jeannie Ortega) (No Place Like Brooklyn)
 2006: "Hear Me" (Jeannie Ortega) (No Place Like Brooklyn)
 2008: "Say What" (KOVAS) (The Arrogance of Youth)
 2008: "Up in Here" (KOVAS) (The Arrogance of Youth)
 2008: "Love & Touch" (KOVAS) (The Arrogance of Youth)
 2008: "Popsicle" (KOVAS) (The Arrogance of Youth)
 2008: "Popcorn" (KOVAS) (The Arrogance of Youth)
 2008: "T.O.A.K" (KOVAS) (The Arrogance of Youth)
 2008: "So Hot" (KOVAS) (Prom Night)
 2008: "Love & Touch" (KOVAS) (Prom Night)
 2008: "Hasta La Vista" (Camp Rock) (Camp Rock)
 2009: "Wax on Wax Off" (KOVAS) (Reagan Babies)
 2009: "Reagan Babies" (KOVAS) (Reagan Babies)
 2009: "Grape Drank" (KOVAS) (Reagan Babies)
 2009: "Can't Get Enough" (KOVAS) (Reagan Babies)
 2010: "It's On" (Camp Rock 2) (Camp Rock 2: The Final Jam)
 2010: "Tear It Down" (Camp Rock 2) (Camp Rock 2: The Final Jam)
 2010: "Been Doing My Thang" (Nyne West) feat.(Yung Joc)
 2010: "Overdrive" (Nyne West) feat.(Mario)&(KOVAS)
 2010: "UpperCut" (Nyne West) feat.(Red Cafe)
 2010: "Full Time Lover" (Nyne West)
 2010: "Roll The Credits" (Roxxi Jane)
 2010: "Ready" (KOVAS)
 2013: "Ice Cream" (KOVAS)
 2013: "Hello Bright Lights" (KOVAS)
 2013: "Student to the Game Mixtape" (KOVAS)
 2014: "Hot Girls"(KOVAS) 22 Jump Street
 2015: "Hello Bright Lights"(KOVAS) Hello, My Name Is Doris
 2016: "Like They Do" (Omarion f Nikki Glaser)
 2018: "Bottle rocket"  KOVAS(feat. Domo Genesis) from Netflix Original Series On My Block
 2019: "Ratata"  Nina Dioz) from Netflix Original Series On My Block
 2020: "Lunch Money"  Ainsley Riches) from Netflix Original Series On My Block
 2020: "Tricky Ricky"  Rosé) from Netflix Original Series On My Block
 2020: "Beat On The Street"  Rosé) from Netflix Original Series On My Block

Remixes
 2005 Billy Crawford f. Kovas – "Steamy Nights (Kovas Ghetto Beat Remix)"  V2 Records
 2006 Shakira f. Wyclef & Kovas – "Hips Don't Lie (Kovas Ghetto Beat Remix)"
 2006 Lady Sovereign – "Fiddle with the Volume (Kovas Ghetto Beat Remix)" Chocolate Industries
 2007 Justin Timberlake – "Summer Love (Kovas Ghetto Beat Remix)"  Jive Records
 2008 Chris Brown – "With You (Kovas Ghetto Beat Remix)"  Jive Records / Ultra Records
 2008 T-Pain f Lil Wayne – "Can't Believe It (Kovas Ghetto Beat Remix)"  Jive Records
 2008 T-Pain f Ludacris – "Chopped & Skrewed (Kovas Ghetto Beat Remix)"  Jive Records
 2009 Ciara f Young Jeezy – "Chopped & Skrewed (Kovas Ghetto Beat Remix)"  Jive Records
 2009 Michelle Williams – "Hello Heartbreak (Kovas Ghetto Beat Remix)"  Sony Records
 2010 Usher f will.i.am – "OMG (Kovas Ghetto Beat Remix)"  Jive Records

Other albums and songs produced by Kovas

References

External links
Kovas official website
[ AllMusic Guide]

1984 births
American hip hop record producers
Living people
Rappers from Brooklyn
Rappers from Manhattan
American people of Moroccan descent
21st-century American rappers
Record producers from New York (state)
Singer-songwriters from New York (state)